Elisabeth Habeler (born 18 November 1974) is an Austrian former professional tennis player.

Habeler reached a best singles ranking on tour of 241 in the world and won an ITF title in Katowice in 1994. She played in the qualifiers for the 1996 Wimbledon Championships.

Her WTA Tour main draw appearances came as a doubles player and included two quarter-finals, at Palermo in 1996 and Warsaw in 1997.

ITF finals

Singles: 1 (1–0)

Doubles: 2 (2–0)

References

External links
 
 

1974 births
Living people
Austrian female tennis players